Donald Dee Carpentier (January 21, 1931 – October 19, 1982) was an American businessman and politician.

Biography
He was born on January 21, 1931, in Moline, Illinois. Carpentier went to the Moline public and parochial schools. He then went to St. Ambrose University. Carpentier owned a drive-in theatre and a laundromat. He was also in the insurance business. His father Charles F. Carpentier also served in the Illinois General Assembly and served as Illinois Secretary of State. Donald Carpentier was convicted in the United States District Court for bribery involving the ready-mixed concrete business and was sentenced to three years in prison. He died on October 19, 1982.

Notes

External links

1931 births
1982 deaths
People from Moline, Illinois
St. Ambrose University alumni
Businesspeople from Illinois
Republican Party Illinois state senators
Illinois politicians convicted of crimes
20th-century American politicians
20th-century American businesspeople